Donje Bare (Serbian Cyrillic: Доње Баре) is a natural lake in Bosnia and Herzegovina, on the mountain Zelengora. It is located below the Ardov peak (1723).

During the winter, the lake is completely ice-bound. Rainbow trout is an invasive species that lives the lake. The water is clean and clear. It is filled with sources springing on the west coast. The bottom is dark blue. Around the lake are meadows and forests, a landscape of alpine pastures, covered with mountain grass, interspersed with scrub and pine trees, and in lower areas of beech.

See also
List of lakes in Bosnia and Herzegovina

References

Lakes of Bosnia and Herzegovina